Political parties in the Bahamas may be "classified", "nonclassified", or "unclassified". Classified parties are "major" or "minor" depending on electoral performance and competitive ability.

Parties represented in Parliament

Classification of Bahamian Political Parties

Classified Major
Progressive Liberal Party (PLP)
Free National Movement (FNM)
Bahamas Democratic Party (BDP)
United Bahamian party (UBP)
Bahama Democrat Labour Party (BDLP)

Classified Minor: Macro
Bahamas Constitution Party (BCP)
Democratic National Alliance (DNA)
Coalition for Democratic Reform (CDR)

Classified Minor: Micro
The People's Movement (TPM)
Bahamas National Coalition Party (BNCP)
Bahamas Constitution Party (BCP)
God's People Party (GPP)
Vanguard Nationalist & Socialist Party (VNSP)

Nonclassified: NANO
Independent

New
Bahamian Way Forward Movement (BWFM)
Coalition of Independents (COI)
Grand Commonwealth Party (GCP)
Kingdom Government Movement (KGM)
Justice Labour Party (JLP)
Righteous Government Movement (RGM)
United Coalition (independents)

Unclassified Political Parties (defunct)
United Bahamian Party (UBP)
National Development Party (NDP)
National Democratic Party
Bahama Democrat Labour Party (BDLP)
Social Democratic Party (SDP)
Workers Party (WP)
Coalition for Democratic Reform (CDR)
Vanguard Nationalist & Socialist Party (VNSP)
Bahamian National Party (BNP)
Bahamas Democratic Party (BDP)
Commonwealth Democratic Party (CDP)

See also
 Lists of political parties

References

Bahamas
 
Political parties
Political parties
Bahamas